Oakhurst is an unincorporated community and census-designated place (CDP) in Creek and Tulsa counties in the U.S. state of Oklahoma. The population was 2,185 at the 2010 census, a loss of 20 percent from 2,731 at the 2000 census.

Geography
Oakhurst is located in western Tulsa County and northeastern Creek County at  (36.079291, -96.051444). It is bordered by Tulsa to the east, Sand Springs to the northwest, and Sapulpa to the south. Interstate 44 passes through the community, with access from exits 221 and 222.

History 
Oakhurst was established in 1918.

Demographics

As of the census of 2000, there were 2,731 people, 1,067 households, and 767 families residing in the CDP. The population density was 406.8 people per square mile (157.1/km2). There were 1,191 housing units at an average density of 177.4 per square mile (68.5/km2). The racial makeup of the CDP was 81.03% White, 1.28% African American, 10.00% Native American, 0.55% Asian, 0.07% Pacific Islander, 0.73% from other races, and 6.33% from two or more races. Hispanic or Latino of any race were 2.49% of the population.

There were 1,067 households, out of which 28.2% had children under the age of 18 living with them, 55.9% were married couples living together, 10.4% had a female householder with no husband present, and 28.1% were non-families. 24.7% of all households were made up of individuals, and 9.0% had someone living alone who was 65 years of age or older. The average household size was 2.56 and the average family size was 3.04.

In the CDP, the population was spread out, with 24.6% under the age of 18, 7.8% from 18 to 24, 28.2% from 25 to 44, 26.4% from 45 to 64, and 12.9% who were 65 years of age or older. The median age was 38 years. For every 100 females, there were 97.8 males. For every 100 females age 18 and over, there were 97.5 males.

The median income for a household in the CDP was $34,858, and the median income for a family was $41,104. Males had a median income of $30,227 versus $20,453 for females. The per capita income for the CDP was $15,125. About 6.7% of families and 8.9% of the population were below the poverty line, including 3.9% of those under age 18 and 4.6% of those age 65 or over.

References

Census-designated places in Creek County, Oklahoma
Census-designated places in Tulsa County, Oklahoma
Census-designated places in Oklahoma